Michal Habánek (born 12 April 1994) is a Slovak football defender who currently plays for Syrianska IF Kerburan.

Club career
He made his league debut for Spartak Trnava against Dunajská Streda on 15 October 2011.

External links
at astrencin.sk

References

1994 births
Living people
Slovak footballers
Association football defenders
FC Spartak Trnava players
FK Senica players
MFK Ružomberok players
Syrianska IF Kerburan players
Slovak Super Liga players
Expatriate footballers in Sweden
Sportspeople from Trenčín